Adam Lorne Braverman (born 1975) is an associate deputy attorney general at the United States Department of Justice who is a former nominee to be a United States district judge of the United States District Court for the Southern District of California.

Education 

Braverman received his Bachelor of Arts, cum laude, from George Washington University and his Juris Doctor from George Washington University Law School.

Legal career 

Upon graduation from law school, Braverman served as a law clerk to Judge Consuelo Callahan of the United States Court of Appeals for the Ninth Circuit and Judge Reggie Walton of the United States District Court for the District of Columbia. He was in private practice at Goodwin Procter LLP in Washington, D.C., where his practice focused on civil litigation, white-collar defense, and internal investigations.

United States Attorney 

Braverman previously served in the United States Attorney's Office for the Southern District of California, including as the United States Attorney and as Deputy Chief of the Criminal Enterprise section. He was sworn in as U.S. Attorney on November 16, 2017. He left office on January 16, 2019, upon the swearing in of his successor, Robert S. Brewer Jr.

Expired nomination to district court 

On August 28, 2019, President Trump announced his intent to nominate Braverman to serve as a United States district judge for the United States District Court for the Southern District of California. On October 17, 2019, his nomination was sent to the Senate. President Trump nominated Braverman to the seat vacated by Judge Roger Benitez, who took senior status on December 31, 2017. On January 3, 2020, his nomination was returned to the President under Rule XXXI, Paragraph 6 of the United States Senate. On February 13, 2020, his renomination was sent to the Senate. On January 3, 2021, his nomination was returned to the President under Rule XXXI, Paragraph 6 of the United States Senate.

References 

1975 births
Living people
20th-century American lawyers
21st-century American lawyers
California lawyers
George Washington University alumni
George Washington University Law School alumni
Lawyers from Columbus, Ohio
United States Department of Justice officials
United States Attorneys for the Southern District of California